A referendum on schools was held in Switzerland on 15 March 1903. Voters were asked whether they approved of a federal resolution on the federal government providing financial support for public elementary schools. It was approved by 76.3% of voters and a majority of cantons.

Background
The referendum was an "obligatory referendum", which required a double majority; a majority of the popular vote and majority of the cantons. The decision of each canton was based on the vote in that canton. Full cantons counted as one vote, whilst half cantons counted as half.

Results

References

1902 referendums
1902 in Switzerland
Referendums in Switzerland